Microsoft Ignition is a music network operated by Microsoft that spans across Windows PCs, Xbox 360 gaming console and Zune music player. Ignition makes available music and music videos across all supported device types and also can be used for promotion of musical artists.

References

Microsoft
Zune
Xbox 360 software